Yans (Yanzi) is a Bantu language spoken in the Democratic Republic of the Congo by the Bayanzi. 

There are six language varieties Guthrie classified as Bantu B.85 (Yans): 
B.85A Mbiem, West Yansi
B.85B East Yans
B.85C Yeei
B.85D Tsong (Itsong, Nsong, Ntsuo, "Songo")
B.85E Mpur (Mput)
B.85F Tsambaan

According to Nurse (2003), most belong to the Yaka languages, but one or two are among the Boma–Dzing languages. Maho (2009) notes that the Tsong variety is the then-unclassified "Songo" language (ISO [soo]) of Ethnologue and is the one that does not belong with the rest. Glottolog likewise classifies "Nsong-Mpiin" [soo] apart from Yansi.

References

Maho (2009)

Boma-Dzing languages
Languages of the Democratic Republic of the Congo
Yaka languages